Girls Incarcerated: Young and Locked Up is an American documentary television series released on Netflix on March 2, 2018, that initially followed the teenage inmates of the Madison Juvenile Correctional Facility in Madison, Indiana which has since been closed down. In season 2, the focus shifted to the teenage inmates of LaPorte Juvenile. Netflix did not officially renew the series for a third season and a release date has not been scheduled.

Episodes

Season 1 (2018)

Season 2 (2019)

References

External links
Girls Incarcerated on Netflix

2018 American television series debuts
2019 American television series endings
2010s American documentary television series
English-language Netflix original programming
Netflix original documentary television series
Television series about teenagers
Television shows set in Indiana